Michael Melka (born 9 July 1978 in Castrop-Rauxel, North Rhine-Westphalia) is a German football player who last played for Alemannia Aachen.

References

1978 births
Living people
People from Castrop-Rauxel
Sportspeople from Münster (region)
German footballers
Borussia Mönchengladbach players
Borussia Mönchengladbach II players
Fortuna Düsseldorf players
SC Preußen Münster players
VfB Remscheid players
Rot-Weiß Oberhausen players
Alemannia Aachen players
Bundesliga players
2. Bundesliga players
3. Liga players
Association football goalkeepers
Hammer SpVg players
Footballers from North Rhine-Westphalia